Arachnomorpha is a proposed subdivision or clade of Arthropoda, comprising the group formed by the trilobites and their close relatives (Artiopoda), Megacheira (which may be paraphyletic) and chelicerates. Under this proposed classification scheme,  Arachnomorpha is considered the sister group to Mandibulata (including insects, crustaceans and myriapods).

The arachnomorph concept has been challenged by suggestions that the artiopods are more closely related to mandibulates, forming the clade Antennulata instead.

There is no consensus as to assigning Arachnomorpha a formal Linnean rank.

Classification

Arachnomorpha Lameere, 1890 [= Arachnata Paulus, 1979, = Palaeopoda Packard, 1903]
†Trilobita Walch, 1771
†Megacheira Hou & Bergstrom, 1997
†Strabopida Hou & Bergström, 1997
†Aglaspida Walcott, 1911
†Cheloniellida Broili, 1932
Chelicerata Heymons 1901
Family †Sanctacarididae Legg & Pates, 2017
Class Pycnogonida Latreille, 1810
Clade Euchelicerata Weygoldt & Paulus, 1979
Genus †Offacolidae Sutton et al., 2002
Clade Prosomapoda Lamsdell, 2013

Phylogeny
Using fossil data, Bergström & Hou (2003) gave an outline of arthropod relationships emphasizing trilobitomorphs (a group that includes trilobites and trilobite-like animals).

References

Arthropod taxonomy
Taxa named by Auguste Lameere